Leithum, Luxembourg is a populated place in the district of Diekirch, at one end of the border that was established in 1839 between Belgium and Luxembourg at the Treaty of London. 

Located at the north-east corner of Luxembourg, Leithum's border crossing connects it by direct roads to both Oberhausen and Stubach 1 kilometer away in Belgium's Hohes Venn-Eifel nature park, and there across the German border to Welchenhausen and Stupbach, respectively.

Geography of Luxembourg
Belgium–Luxembourg border crossings